Clonard College is an independent Roman Catholic secondary day school for girls, located in Herne Hill, a suburb of Geelong, in Victoria, Australia. Founded and owned by the Brigidine Sisters in 1956, Clonard College follows the traditions of the Brigidine order and Kildare Ministries. The College Principal, since 2019, is Luci Quinn.

Overview
Clonard School came into official existence in 1956. At the invitation of Father John Tresidder (Manifold Parish Priest), the Brigidine Sisters acquired the Clonard property and retained the name "Clonard" because of the association between Saint Brigid and Saint Finnian of Clonard in fifth century Ireland. There was a crisis in Catholic education at the time as Sacred Heart, Geelong's only all-girls Catholic college, was severely overcrowded.

In early 1956, a group of founder sisters, including the much lauded Sister Lelia Grant, began taking classes at Clonard. In its initial year, 40 students attended Clonard College. Clonard College was officially opened on 9 February 1958.

Key moments in the college's development included the simultaneous construction of an assembly hall and library, in 1977, partly funded by the first Federal grant. In 1983, John Shannon became the first full-time lay Principal. In the late 1990s Clonard's leadership followed the example of some other Brigidine schools in adopting Co Principalship model when Vicki Myers (a former Clonard student) joined Michael Doyle in the Co-Principal positions.

The late 1990s and early part of the 21st century saw revitalised enrolment growth, accommodated by expansive building programs, delivering a theatre, design education centre, materials technology room, expanded office space, refurbished science facilities, a gymnasium and multi purpose court within the school grounds.

In 2006 Clonard celebrated its 50th anniversary with a range of functions involving past students and key founders. The year of celebration reached its peak with the Anniversary Dinner at Kardinia Park and concluded with the 2006 Celebration of Achievement Evening at Costa Hall, whose theme reflected 50 years of achievement in the name of Clonard.

In physical terms, the college's expansion and development continued with the opening of the newly built two-storey Year 12 Center, containing a number of modern and flexible learning areas and office spaces on its upper floor and the large "Independent Learning Centre", beneath, dedicated to serving the particular personal and academic needs of the college's Year 12 girls.

Early in 2008, the year 7 rooms along Church Street were demolished to allow construction of a modern, two-storey Year 7 Centre, equipped with a range of sustainability technologies. The Year 7 Learning Centre was officially opened on 24 April 2009.

In November 2012, it was announced that Clonard College had purchased "Minerva", a former campus of Western Heights College. In 2013,  Clonard embarked on a major building project with the construction of a new Yr. 8 & 9 Centre, along with the demolition and refurbishment of the Minerva road campus. In September 2018, a multipurpose building along the Church Street entrance was completed and opened to students, mainly consisting of a library and counselling services.

House system
Clonard has a house system consisting of four houses:
Kildare (green) - Named after County Kildare in Ireland, where St. Brigid lived.
Lelia (red) - Named after Sister Lelia Grant, one of the school's founding nuns.
Finian (white) - Named after St. Finian of Clonard.
Xavier (yellow) - Named after St. Francis Xavier.

See also 

 List of non-government schools in Victoria
 List of schools in Geelong
 Victorian Certificate of Education
 Vocational Education and Training
 Victorian Certificate of Applied Learning

References

External links
 Clonard College website

Educational institutions established in 1956
Schools in Geelong
1956 establishments in Australia
Girls' schools in Victoria (Australia)
Catholic secondary schools in Victoria (Australia)
Brigidine schools